Skra Rugby Warsaw (Skra Rugby Warszawa) is a Polish rugby club based in Warsaw. They play in the top-tier Ekstraliga.

References

External links
 Skra Warsaw official website

Polish rugby union teams
Sport in Warsaw
Rugby